Seven ships of the British Royal Navy have been named HMS Gibraltar, after the British overseas territory of Gibraltar.

 The first  was a 20-gun sixth rate built in 1711, rebuilt in 1727, and sold in 1748. It was the first command of John Byng, who was afterwards to be court-martialled and executed in the opening stages of the Seven Years' War. 
 The second  was a 20-gun sixth rate in service from 1754 to 1773.
 The third  was an American 14-gun brig captured in 1779, then in turn captured by the Spanish in 1781.
 The fourth  was the 80-gun Spanish  captured at the Battle of Cape St. Vincent in 1780, used as a powder hulk in 1813 and broken up in 1836.
 The fifth HMS Gibraltar was a 101-gun screw first rate launched in 1860, on loan as a training ship in 1872, renamed Grampian in 1889, and sold in 1899.
 The sixth  was an  launched in 1892, made into a depot ship in 1912, and sold in 1923.

See also

References 
 

Royal Navy ship names
Military of Gibraltar